Nicholas Caserio (born December 27, 1975) is an American football executive who is the general manager of the Houston Texans of the National Football League (NFL). Caserio began his NFL career as a coaching assistant with the New England Patriots before working as a scout and executive for them throughout the 2000s and 2010s.

Playing career
Caserio played his high school football at University School in Hunting Valley, Ohio from 1992 to 1994.  Caserio then attended John Carroll University, where he played football as a quarterback from 1995 to 1998. A three-time academic All-Ohio Athletic Conference selection, he was also a teammate of Las Vegas Raiders Head Coach and then-John Carroll wide receiver Josh McDaniels and Washington Redskins linebacker London Fletcher.

Coaching career

College
Caserio began his coaching career as a graduate assistant at Saginaw Valley State University from 1999 to 2000, earning his MBA at the same time. In the spring of 2001, he served as a graduate assistant at Central Michigan University before being hired by the Patriots.

New England Patriots
In 2002, Caserio served as an offensive coaching assistant coach for the Patriots before shifting back to the scouting department in 2003. In 2007, Caserio moved back to coaching as the Patriots' wide receivers coach. While still remaining a part of the personnel department, Caserio assisted the offensive coaching staff during the 2009 preseason, which included new wide receivers coach Chad O'Shea and tight ends coach Shane Waldron. Caserio also continued to assist the coaching staff from the press box during games along with football research director Ernie Adams.

Executive career

New England Patriots
In 2001, Caserio was hired by the New England Patriots as a personnel assistant. Caserio moved to the scouting department as an area scout in 2003. In 2004, Caserio was promoted to the Patriots' director of pro personnel, a position he served until 2006. In 2008 Caserio returned to the personnel department as the Patriots' director of player personnel. He remained in that position through the 2020 season. During Caserio's tenure with the Patriots, his position as director of player personnel did not give him final say over the roster; that power was held by Patriots head coach Bill Belichick.

Houston Texans
On January 7, 2021, Caserio was named the general manager of the Houston Texans after spending 20 seasons with the New England Patriots.

Personal life
Caserio earned his degree in finance from John Carroll University and later earned his master's of business administration from Saginaw Valley State University. Caserio and his wife, Kathleen, were married in June 2009 and have three daughters together.

References

External links
Houston Texans bio

1975 births
Living people
People from Lyndhurst, Ohio
American football quarterbacks
Houston Texans executives
John Carroll Blue Streaks football players
National Football League general managers
Saginaw Valley State University alumni
Saginaw Valley State Cardinals football coaches
Central Michigan Chippewas football coaches
New England Patriots coaches
New England Patriots executives
New England Patriots scouts